The Montana State Legislature is the state legislature of the U.S. state of Montana. It is composed of the 100-member Montana House of Representatives and the 50-member Montana Senate.

This is a list of current and former notable members of the Montana Senate. 
 LeRoy H. Anderson
 J. Hugo Aronson
 Ron Arthun
 Shannon Augare
 Joe Balyeat
 Debby Barrett
 Chet Blaylock
 Anders Blewett
 John Bohlinger
 Gary Branae
 John Brenden
 Bob Brown (Montana politician)
 Roy Brown (Montana politician)
 Taylor Brown
 Edward Buttrey
 Mary Caferro
 Vicki Cocchiarella
 Mike Cooney
 Bruce Crippen
 Wesley A. D'Ewart
 Steve Daines
 Zales Ecton
 Jim Elliott
 Ron Erickson
 Jeff Essmann
 Tom Facey
 Steve Gallus
 Kim Gillan
 Bradley Maxon Hamlett
 Ken Hansen
 Dan Harrington (politician)
 Bob Hawks
 Greg Hinkle
 Elmer Holt
 Rowlie Hutton
 Verdell Jackson
 Larry Jent
 Greg Jergeson
 Llew Jones
 Thomas Lee Judge
 Carol Juneau
 Christine Kaufmann (Montana politician)
 Jim Keane (politician)
 Ken Miller (Montana politician)
 Allen Kolstad
 Bob Lake
 Cliff Larsen
 Lane Larson
 Jesse Laslovich
 Dave Lewis (politician)
 Greg Lind
 John Melcher
 Frederick Moore (politician)
 Lynda Moss
 Carmine Mowbray
 Terry Murphy (American politician)
 Henry L. Myers
 Edwin L. Norris
 Donald Grant Nutter
 Alan Olson
 Gerald Pease
 Jim Peterson (Montana politician)
 Jason Priest
 Rick Ripley
 Don Ryan
 Trudi Schmidt
 Jim Shockley
 Frank Smith (Montana politician)
 Jon Sonju
 Carolyn Squires
 Corey Stapleton
 Donald Steinbeisser
 Stan Stephens
 Sharon Stewart-Peregoy
 Robert Story
 Tom Stout
 Jon Tester
 Joseph Tropila
 Mitch Tropila
 Bruce Tutvedt
 Kendall Van Dyk
 Chas Vincent
 Gene Vuckovich
 Edward Walker (politician)
 David Wanzenried
 Dan Weinberg
 Benjamin F. White (Montana politician)
 Carol Williams (Montana politician)
 Bill Wilson (Montana politician)
 Jonathan Windy Boy
 Art Wittich
 Bill Yellowtail
 Ryan Zinke

See also
 List of people from Montana
 List of Montana state representatives

References 

State Senators
Montana